Asylum is a 1985 album by The Legendary Pink Dots.

Track listing

Personnel
The Prophet Qa'Spel – voice, keyboards
The Silverman (Phil Knight) – keyboards
Stret Majest (Barry Gray) – guitar
Patrick Q Paganini (Patrick Wright) – violin, keyboards, vocals
Poison Barbarella (Julia Niblock Waller of Attrition) – bass, keyboards, vocals
Adantacathar (Graham Whitehead) – keyboards

Additional personnel
Steven Stapleton – tape editing

Notes
The SPV edition contains different artwork than that of the other editions.

References

1985 albums
The Legendary Pink Dots albums